Castelvetere in Val Fortore is a comune (municipality) in the Province of Benevento in the Italian region Campania, located about 90 km northeast of Naples and about 35 km northeast of Benevento in the upper valley of the Fortore River (Sannio).

Main sights
Remains of the defensive tower
Portal of the church of St. Nicholas, with some fine sculptures
Palazzo Marchesale (18th century)
Communal Villa (garden)

References

Cities and towns in Campania